Elliott Mendelson (May 24, 1931 – May 7, 2020) was an American logician. He was a professor of mathematics at Queens College of the City University of New York, and the Graduate Center, CUNY. He was Jr. Fellow, Society of Fellows, Harvard University, 1956–58.

Career 
Mendelson earned his BA from Columbia University and PhD from Cornell University.

Mendelson taught mathematics at the college level for more than 30 years, and is the author of books on logic, philosophy of mathematics, calculus, game theory and mathematical analysis.

His Introduction to Mathematical Logic, first published in 1964, was reviewed by Dirk van Dalen who noted that it included "a large variety of subjects that should be part of the education of any mathematics student with an interest in foundational matters."

Books

Sole author

Co-author

Editor

Journal articles 
P. C. Gilmore, Donald A. Martin & Elliott Mendelson (1975). Meeting of the Association for Symbolic Logic. Journal of Symbolic Logic 40 (2):299-304.
Hugues Leblanc, Elliott Mendelson & Alex Orenstein (1984). Preface. Synthese 60 (1).
Elliott Mendelson (2005). Book Review: Igor Lavrov, Larisa Maksimova, Problems in Set Theory, Mathematical Logic and the Theory of Algorithms, Edited by Giovanna Corsi, Kluwer Academic / Plenum Publishers, 2003, Us$141.00, Pp. XII + 282, Hardbound. Studia Logica 79 (3).
Elliott Mendelson (2000). Critical Studies/Book Reviews. Philosophia Mathematica 8 (3).
Elliott Mendelson (2007). Graham Oppy. Philosophical Perspectives on Infinity. Philosophia Mathematica 15 (3).
Elliott Mendelson (1956) "Some Proofs of Independence in Axiomatic Set Theory", Journal of Symbolic Logic 21(3): 291–303.
Elliott Mendelson (1990) "Second Thoughts About Church's Thesis and Mathematical Proofs", Journal of Philosophy 87(5): 225–233.
Elliott Mendelson (1956) "The Independence of a Weak Axiom of Choice", Journal of Symbolic Logic 21(4): 350–366.
Sidney Morgenbesser & Elliott Mendelson (1966) "Annual Meeting of the Association for Symbolic Logic", Journal of Symbolic Logic 31(4):682-696.

Notes

American logicians
Philosophers of mathematics
20th-century American philosophers
Queens College, City University of New York faculty
2020 deaths
1931 births
Columbia College (New York) alumni
Cornell University alumni